Ellis is the stage name of Hamilton, Ontario based dream pop musician Linnea Siggelkow.

Early life
Siggelkow's mother was a piano teacher. Siggelkow learned how to play guitar at age 12 after watching the music video for Avril Lavigne's song Complicated (Avril Lavigne song).

Career
After uploading some GarageBand demos online, Siggelkow garnered the attention of Palehound and Soccer Mommy, who both invited her to open for them on their respective tours. On January 22, 2020, Siggelkow announced plans to release her debut album titled Born Again on April 3, 2020. The album was released on Fat Possum Records.

Discography

Studio albums
Born Again (Fat Possum, 2020)

References

Year of birth missing (living people)
Living people
Canadian indie pop musicians